The Year of the Hare may refer to:

 The Year of the Hare (novel), a 1975 Finnish novel
 The Year of the Hare (1977 film), a 1977 Finnish drama based on the novel The Year of the Hare
 The Year of the Hare (2006 film), a 2006 French film based on the novel The Year of the Hare
 "Year of the Hare" (song), a 2015 single by the Canadian band Fucked Up

See also
 Chinese zodiac
 Chinese calendar
 Year of the Rabbit (disambiguation)